Bambora, formerly IP Payments, is a PCI Level 1 compliant financial services organisation that provides payments, accounts receivable automation and PCI DSS compliance solutions. IP Payments operates in Australia, New Zealand and the United Kingdom.
IP Payments is listed on the Asia Pacific Deloitte Fast 500. as well as winning "Most Innovative Financial Application" in Asia Pacific at the 2010 APICTA Awards event held in Malaysia.

History
IP Payments was founded in 2004 by Jamie Collins, Mark Lewis and Anthony Fulton. The company provides customised accounts receivable, payments and PCI DSS compliance solutions. The company services over 3500 enterprises including global organisations.

In August 2015, IP Payments was acquired by Swedish payments group Bambora,  which had been founded by Johan Tjärnberg the previous year, Two years later, Bambora was acquired by Ingenico Group of France, which subsequently merged with Worldline in late 2020.

Services
Bambora offers services which customise and automate existing account receivables operations, including third-party software the client might use, as well as merchant level 1 PCI DSS compliance solutions and payment gateways to clients who process credit card transactions.

Bambora services include multiple payment methods (credit card, charge card, direct debit, direct credit, BPay and Over-the-Counter) across multiple payment channels (Internet, mobile, PS3, call centre, batch and recurring) utilising multiple payment types (purchase, refund, pre-auth and completion).

In September 2012, Bambora (then IP Payments) released a study of PCI compliance in Australia

Awards and mentions
2012 Deloitte Asia Pacific Fast 500
2012 Deloitte Australia Fast 50
2011 Deloitte Asia Pacific Fast 500
2011 Deloitte Australia Fast 50
2010 Deloitte Australia Fast 50
2010 Asia Pacific ICT Award (APICTA) - "Most Innovative Financial Industry Application"
2010 iAwards - Financial Industry Application sponsored by KPMG
2009 Deloitte Asia Pacific Fast 500
2008 Listed in MIS Strategic 100
2008 Deloitte Asia Pacific Fast 500 Rank: 128
2008 AIIA National iAward for Innovation across all iAward categories

See also
PCI DSS
Payment gateway
Accounts Receivable
Electronic Bill Presentment and Payment

References

External links
IP Payments - Making Cash Flow

Online financial services companies of Australia
Financial services companies based in Sydney
Online payments
Australian companies established in 2004
Financial services companies established in 2004
Payment service providers
Merchant services